Juan Amarillo may refer to:

 Juan Amarillo River, river on the Bogotá savanna
 Tibabuyes or Juan Amarillo Wetland, wetland on the Bogotá savanna